Tambeae was a Roman civitas located in the province of Byzacena in Africa Proconsulare. It existed from the Roman era into late antiquity.

Bishopric
Tambeae must have been of some importance as it was the seat of an ancient Christian diocese which remains today as a titular see of the Roman Catholic Church.

There are five documented bishops of this African diocese. 
Secondiano took part in the council held in Carthage in 256 by St. Cyprian to discuss the question concerning the lapsii. 
Gemellio took part in the council of Cabarsussi, held in 393 by the Maximianists, a dissident sect of the Donatists, and signed the deeds. 
At the Carthage conference of 411, which saw the Catholic and Donatist bishops of Roman Africa gathered together, the town was represented by the Catholic bishop Sopater and the Donatist Faustino. 
Servus Dei intervened at the synod gathered in Carthage by Huneric the Vandal king in 484, after which he was exiled.

Today Tambeae survives as a titular bishop's seat; the current titular bishop is John Anthony Boissonneau, auxiliary bishop of Toronto.

Pedro Aguilera Narbona (1966 -  1968)
 Francisco Raval Cruces (1968 - 1970)
 Beato Oscar Amulfo Romero y Galdamez  (1970 - 1974)
 Angélico Sândalo Bernardino (1974 - 2000)
 John Anthony Boissonneau, 2001

References

Archaeological sites in Tunisia
Roman towns and cities in Africa (Roman province)